Château-Voué is a commune in the Moselle department in Grand Est in north-eastern France.

Localities of the commune: Bérange (German: Beringen) and Dédeling (German: Dedlingen).

See also
 Communes of the Moselle department
 Parc naturel régional de Lorraine

References

External links
 

Chateauvoue